Wudi County is a county in the northwest of Shandong province, People's Republic of China, bordering Hebei province to the northwest and the Bohai Sea to the north. It is the northernmost county-level division of the prefecture-level city of Binzhou.

The population in 1999 was 424,456.

Administrative divisions
As 2012, this County is divided to 2 subdistricts, 8 towns and 2 townships.
Subdistricts
 Difeng Subdistrict
 Haifeng Subdistrict

Towns

Townships
 Xinyang Township
 Xixiaowang Township

Climate

References

External links
 Official site

Counties of Shandong